Wormed By Leonard is the debut studio-recorded cassette by the band Thinking Fellers Union Local 282, released in 1988 through Thwart Productions. It was reissued on LP and CD in 1995 with six live bonus tracks. The title derives from Roger Worm and Jerry Leonard, two high school classmates of Eickelberg and Davies from West Delaware Senior High School, in Manchester, Iowa.

Critical reception
Trouser Press called the album "the band’s most delicate recording, showing an early folky vein." The Spin Alternative Record Guide wrote that the album "contains potentially hazardous levels of low-fi noisemaking and free-association poetry." Reviewing the album's 1995 reissue, SF Weekly wrote that "all of the Thinking Fellers' trademark elements appear in nascent glory, from alternatively tuned string-tornado rave-ups and enigmatic home recordings to quirky pop distillations and jokey goofs."

Track listing

Personnel 
Thinking Fellers Union Local 282
Paul Bergmann – instruments
Mark Davies – instruments
Anne Eickelberg – instruments
Brian Hageman – instruments
Hugh Swarts – instruments
Production and additional personnel
Greg Freeman – production, engineering
Margaret Murray – illustrations
Thinking Fellers Union Local 282 – production
David Tholfsen – contrabass clarinet on "Get Off My House"

References

External links 
 

1988 debut albums
Thinking Fellers Union Local 282 albums